Hutton is a small civil parish about  west of Penrith in the English county of Cumbria.  The parish contains the small mansion and former pele tower of Hutton John, the seat of the Hudleston family.

At the UK census 2011 the parish had a population of 438.

The parish of Hutton was created in 1934 from the merger of Hutton John and Hutton Soil parishes, both of which were formerly part of the original ecclesiastical and civil parish of Greystoke.  The parish also includes the larger village of Penruddock and the hamlets of Troutbeck and Beckces.  Whitbarrow holiday village is also within the parish.  Administratively, Hutton forms part of Eden District. It has a parish council, the lowest tier of local government.

Listed buildings

There are 13 listed buildings in the parish. Hutton John, mentioned above, is Grade I and the remainder are Grade II.

References

External links
 Cumbria County History Trust: Hutton John (nb: provisional research only – see Talk page)
 Cumbria County History Trust: Hutton Soil (nb: provisional research only – see Talk page)

 
Hamlets in Cumbria
Civil parishes in Cumbria
Eden District